This article is about cod and other cod-like fishes from the family of Gadidae, such as haddock, pollock, and whiting, regarded as food.

Cod

Cod is popular as a food with a mild flavour and a dense, flaky white flesh. Young Atlantic cod or haddock prepared in strips for cooking is called scrod. Cod's soft liver can be canned or fermented into cod liver oil, providing an excellent source of vitamin A, vitamin D, vitamin E and omega-3 fatty acids (EPA and DHA). Cod flesh is moist and flaky when cooked and is white in colour. In the United Kingdom, Atlantic cod is one of the most common ingredients in fish and chips, along with haddock and plaice. Cod can be easily turned into various other products, such as cod liver oil, omega pills, etc.

Other cod-like fish

Haddock

Haddock is a very popular food fish, sold fresh, smoked, frozen, dried, and, to a small extent, canned. Haddock, along with cod and plaice, is one of the most popular fish used in British fish and chips.

Fresh haddock has a clean white flesh and can be cooked in the same ways as cod. Freshness of a haddock fillet can be determined by how well it holds together, as a fresh one will be firm; also, fillets should be translucent, while older fillets turn a chalky hue. Young, fresh haddock and cod fillets are often sold as scrod in Boston, Massachusetts; this refers to the size of the fish which have a variety of sizes, i.e. scrod, markets, and cows. Haddock is the predominant fish of choice in Scotland in a fish supper. It is also the main ingredient of Norwegian fishballs (fiskeboller).

Unlike the related cod, haddock does not salt well and is often preserved by drying and smoking.

The smoking of haddock is something that was highly refined in Grimsby. Traditional Grimsby smoked fish (mainly haddock, but sometimes cod) is produced in the traditional smoke houses in Grimsby, which are mostly family-run businesses that have developed their skills over many generations. Grimsby fish market sources its haddock from the North East Atlantic, principally Iceland, Norway and Faroe. These fishing grounds are sustainably managed and have not seen the large scale depreciation in fish stocks seen in EU waters.

One popular form of haddock is Finnan haddie, named for the fishing village of Finnan or Findon in Scotland, where it was originally cold-smoked over peat. Finnan haddie is often served poached in milk for breakfast.

The town of Arbroath on the east coast of Scotland produces the Arbroath Smokie. This is a hot-smoked haddock which requires no further cooking before eating.

Smoked haddock naturally has an off-white color; it is very often dyed yellow, as are other smoked fish. Smoked haddock is the essential ingredient in the Anglo-Indian dish kedgeree.

In 2010, Greenpeace International has added the haddock to its seafood red list. "The Greenpeace International seafood red list is a list of fish that are commonly sold in supermarkets around the world, and which have a very high risk of being sourced from unsustainable fisheries."

Pollock

Atlantic pollock is largely considered to be a whitefish, although it is a fairly strongly flavored one. Traditionally a popular source of food in some countries, such as Norway, in the United Kingdom it has previously been largely consumed as a cheaper and versatile alternative to cod and haddock. However, in recent years pollock has become more popular due to over-fishing of cod and haddock. It can now be found in most supermarkets as fresh fillets or prepared freezer items. For example, it is used minced in fish fingers or as an ingredient in imitation crab meat.

Because of its slightly gray color, pollock is often prepared, as in Norway, as fried fish balls, or if juvenile sized, breaded with oatmeal and fried, as in Shetland. Year-old fish are traditionally split, salted and dried over a peat hearth in Orkney, where their texture becomes wooden and somewhat phosphorescent. The fish can also be salted and smoked and achieve a salmon-like orange color (although it is not closely related to the salmon), as is the case in Germany where the fish is commonly sold as Seelachs or sea salmon. In Korea, pollock may be repeatedly frozen and melted to create hwangtae, half-dried to create ko-da-ri, or fully dried and eaten as book-o.

In 2009, U.K. supermarket Sainsbury's renamed pollock 'Colin' in a bid to boost ecofriendly sales of the fish as an alternative to cod. The supermarket also suggested some shoppers may be too embarrassed to ask for the species under its proper title, due to its reputation as an inferior fish, and its similarity to a popular English swear word (bollocks). Sainsbury's, which said the new name was derived from the French for cooked pollock (colin), launched the product under the banner "Colin and chips can save British cod."

Dishes

See also

 Alaska pollock as food
 Arbroath smokie
 Boknafisk
 Cod liver oil
 Dried and salted cod
 Stockfish
 Filet-O-Fish
 List of smoked foods

Notes

References 

 
 O'Clair, Rita M. and O'Clair, Charles E., "Pacific herring," Southeast Alaska's Rocky Shores: Animals. pg. 343–346. Plant Press: Auke Bay, Alaska (1998).

External links

Long term trends in Norwegian cod fisheries – the pioneers
Species factsheet on cod from the UK Sea Fish Industry Authority (PDF, 2MB)

 
Commercial fish
Smoked fish